"Saltwater" is a song by English musician Chicane featuring the vocals of Irish singer Máire Brennan. The track uses parts of Clannad's 1982 hit "Theme from Harry's Game" with both re-recorded and newly written lyrics.

It was released as a single in May 1999, reaching the number-six position on the UK Singles Chart and becoming a popular trance track in clubs across Europe. In 2003, the song was used in a national tourism campaign for Ireland and also by Belfast City Council in adverts promoting the city.

Music video
Filmed in February 1999, the music video for "Saltwater" juxtaposes calm surfing footage, which was shot in Woolacombe, North Devon, where many beaches that are popular surfer destinations are located, with frenzied nightclub footage, which was shot at a studio on Old Street in London as well as at the actual Gatecrasher One club in Sheffield (known as "The Republic" at the time).

Formats and track listings

UK CD single
 "Saltwater" (original radio edit)
 "Saltwater" (original mix)
 "Saltwater" (Mothership mix)

UK 12-inch single
A. "Saltwater" (original mix) – 9:49
B. "Saltwater" (Tomski vs. Disco Citizens remix) – 8:45

UK cassette single
 "Saltwater" (original radio edit)
 "Saltwater" (Mothership mix)

European CD single
 "Saltwater" (original edit)
 "Saltwater" (original mix)

Australian CD single
 "Saltwater" (original edit)
 "Saltwater" (original mix)
 "Saltwater" (Mothership mix)
 "Saltwater" (Tomski vs. Disco Citizens remix)

US maxi-CD single
 "Saltwater" (original mix) – 9:48
 "Saltwater" (Tomski vs. Disco Citizens remix) – 9:08
 "Don't Give Up" (Peter Rauhofer Roxy Anthem) – 10:00
 "Don't Give Up" (Johnny Vicious club mix) – 9:31
 "Autumn Tactics" (Chicane's End of Summer remix) – 8:41

US 12-inch single
A1. "Saltwater" (original mix) – 9:48
A2. "Halcyon" (Airscape remix) – 7:00
B1. "Saltwater" (Tomski vs. Disco Citizens remix) – 9:08
B2. "Autumn Tactics" (Thrillseekers remix) – 8:07

Charts

Weekly charts

Year-end charts

Certifications

References

1999 singles
1999 songs
Chicane (musician) songs
Songs written by Chicane (musician)
Songs written by Ciarán Brennan
Songs written by Pól Brennan
Trance songs